Thirlby Field (officially Thirlby Field at Harry T. Running Stadium) is a 7,000-seat football stadium located in Traverse City, Michigan. It was built in 1934 on a site where football has been played since 1896 by the Traverse City Trojans. It is the home of the Traverse City Central Trojans, Traverse City West Titans and St. Francis Gladiators.

History

Original history 
Thirlby Field originally ran north and south along Pine Street when play began in 1896. Mr. Thirlby, a local farmer gave the land to the Traverse City Schools for athletic contests. In the early years it was known as Thirlby's farm fields, or 12th Street Athletic Field.

The current configuration facing east and west was originally built in 1934 and was one of the first lighted athletic fields in Northern Michigan. It was then officially given the name "Thirlby Field" in honor of former mayor and Dr. Thirlby, a relative of the farmer Thirlby.

Recent history 
The stadium seated 5,000 until 1995 and is the only football stadium in Traverse City. Seating was then enlarged to approximately 7,000 at that time. Improvements to the stadium including the addition of locker rooms, public bathrooms, and an elevator to the press-box were made in 2009. While the stadium has a capacity of 7,000 it has hosted crowds of up to 12,000 for the annual TC Central/TC West football game.

The stadium received a new Daktronics scoreboard in 2021.

References 

Traverse City, Michigan
Traverse City Central-Traverse City West Rivalry
American football venues in Michigan
Sports venues completed in 1896
Sports in Traverse City, Michigan
1896 establishments in Michigan
High school football venues in the United States